Helga Haase ( Obschernitzki; 9 June 1934 – 16 June 1989) was a speed skater in East Germany. She was born in Danzig and died in East Berlin.

Career
Haase's career began 1952, when she introduced herself at 18 years at the SC Dynamo Berlin, which looked for high-speed ice skaters to the world and married thereupon her coach Helmut Haase.

From 1957 to 1967, Haase (hare) reached 15 GDR master skating titles on separate distances (Einzelstrecken), an additional seven titles in combination results (samalog, or Mehrkampf in German) and a further four on a very small indoor rink (Kleinbahn), a fore-runner of present indoor short track skating.

1960 Winter Olympics
In preparation for the Olympic Winter Games of 1960, she went to Davos with the ladies of the unified German team and broke the multi-combination world record in Davos, Switzerland. With the 1960 Winter Olympics in Squaw Valley, she won, as the first German speed skater and as the first sportswoman of the GDR, a gold medal at the Olympic Winter Games, the gold medal over 500 m. That medal also was the first Olympic medal for any woman in speed skating, as it was not before on the Olympic program. She also won the silver medal over 1000 m and finished at a respectable 8th place over 1500 m, and all of this despite the prohibition of the entry for her husband/coach.

1964 Winter Olympics
In the Olympic season of 1964, she reached again peak performance, with a fourth place in the 1000 m and a fifth place over 1500 m with the Olympic Games in Innsbruck. In the course of her career, Haase skated 23 German records.

Post-career
In 1978, her grandson Robert Haase was born. Starting from 1984 she retired because of disablement. She worked also in the central guidance of the Sportvereinigung Dynamo.

Gallery

Records

References

Notes

Bibliography

 Eng, Trond. All Time International Championships, Complete Results 1889–2002. Askim, Norway: WSSSA Skøytenytt, 2002.
 Teigen, Magne. Komplette resultater, Internasjonale Mesterskap 1889–1989 (in Norwegian). Veggli, Norway: WSSSA Skøytenytt, 1989.
 Zickow, Alfred. 100 Jahre Deutsche Eisschnellaufmeisterschaften, 1891–1991. Ein Beitrag zur Geschichte des Eisschnellaufes (in German). Berlin, Germany: DESG, 1991.

1934 births
1989 deaths
German female speed skaters
Olympic speed skaters of the United Team of Germany
Olympic gold medalists for the United Team of Germany
Olympic silver medalists for the United Team of Germany
Olympic medalists in speed skating
Speed skaters at the 1960 Winter Olympics
Speed skaters at the 1964 Winter Olympics
Medalists at the 1960 Winter Olympics
Medalists at the 1964 Winter Olympics
People from the Free City of Danzig
Naturalized citizens of Germany
Sportspeople from Gdańsk